The following lists events that happened during 2013 in the Maldives.

Incumbents
President: Mohammed Waheed Hassan (until 17 November), Abdulla Yameen (starting 17 November)
Vice President: Mohammed Waheed Deen (until 10 November), Mohamed Jameel Ahmed (starting 10 November)

Events

September
 September 7 - Voters in the Maldives go to the polls for a presidential election with no candidate achieving an outright majority with a runoff election to be held on September 28.

October
 October 22 - The Maldives sets a new date for a presidential election to be held on November 9.

November
 November 9 - Voters in the Maldives go to the polls for the second round of a presidential election.
 November 16 - Voters in the Maldives go to the polls for a presidential election with Abdulla Yameen winning the election with 51.3% of the vote.
 November 17 - Abdulla Yameen is sworn in as the President of the Maldives following yesterday's election victory.

References

 
2010s in the Maldives
Years of the 21st century in the Maldives
Maldives
Maldives